Lakeview Parkway, a yet-to-be-entirely-completed street (currently about  long) in Utah County, Utah, United States, that is mostly located within the city limits of Provo and runs along length of the south and west sides of the city. The parkway serves the Provo Municipal Airport and the new campus of Provo High School. Upon final completion, it will be a four- to five-lane road running from Geneva Road (State Route 114 [SR‑114]) at 2000 North to South State Street (U.S. Route 89 [US‑89]), running along nearly the entire west and south sides of Provo.

Route description

As of early 2020, the street begins immediately north of the intersection with the west end of West 1280 North on the northwest corner of the new campus of Provo High School, which was completed in 2019, in northwestern Provo. (West 1280 North heads east along the north side of the high school campus to Lakeshore Drive.) From its temporary western terminus, with wetlands of Utah Lake to the west, the street heads south-southeast along the west side of the high school campus (passing the school's baseball field, tennis courts, and football field) to connect with the west end of Bulldog Drive (which heads northeasterly on the south edge of the high school campus to connect with Lakeshore Drive). Upon passing Bulldog Drive, the street leaves the limits of Provo and enters and unincorporated area of Utah County. From Bulldog Drive the street briefly continues south-southeast before curving to head south to connect with the west end of West 620 South. (That street heads east to cross Lakeshore Drive and eventually ends at Geneva Road [SR‑114].)

As of early 2020, there is a gap in the street between south of West 620 South and West Center Street. However, this section, which will include a bridge over the Provo River, is currently under construction.

The street resumes at West Center Street, nearly due south of its previous temporary end and once again is within the limits of Provo. (West Center Street heads west to Utah Lake State Park and east to Lakeshore Drive, Geneva Road [SR‑114], Interstate 15 [I‑15], US‑89, and downtown Provo.) From West Center Street, Lakeview Parkway heads south, but quickly curves to the southeast and promptly reaches a T-intersection with the south end of Lakeshore Drive. The street then curves to the south to follow the alignment of what was formerly designated as South 3110 West, connecting with the west end of West 280 South (a gravel road) along the way. Heading south the street connects with the east end of West 550 South before reaching the east end of Mike Jense Parkway, which briefly heads west-southwest before reaching the Provo Municipal Airport. (Prior to the construction of Lakeview Parkway, South 3110 West headed south to seamlessly curve into Mike Jense Parkway, but now that road has a T-intersection with Lakeview Parkway.)

From Mike Jense Parkway, Lakeview Parkway heads southerly, before curving to the east, then the northeast, then to the east-southeast, and then to the southeast before connecting with the south end of South 1600 West. The street then continues east-southeast to connect with the south end of South 1100 West and then southeasterly to connect with the south end of South 500 West. (South 500 West runs north to connect with US‑89 [at West 300 South] and West Center Street [SR‑114].) Lakeview Parkway then heads east to the I‑15/U.S. Route 189 (US‑189) interchange. (Between Mike Jense Parkway and I‑15, Lakeview Parkway runs just north of more wetlands of the Provo Bay of Utah Lake.) Within the interchange, Lakeview Parkway first crosses the southbound on ramp and then connects with the southbound on/off ramp. It then crosses the northbound off ramp, which is also the south end of South University Avenue (US‑189). Finally the street connects with the northbound on ramp for westbound traffic on the parkway. (Eastbound traffic on the parkway must turn north [left] on to University Parkway [US‑189] to access the northbound on ramp to I‑15.)

Beyond the I‑15/US‑189 interchange, Lakeview Parkway heads east (along the road formerly designated as East 1860 South). After an intersection with Novell Place (which does not yet continue beyond south of the intersection) Lakeview Parkway connects with the south end of South East Bay Boulevard. Between South University Avenue and South East Bay Boulevard, the Utah Valley Express (UVX) bus rapid transit line runs westbound only, with its East Bay South station (on the north side of the street) along the way. Continuing east, the street passes through the intersection with the south end of South 700 East and the west end of 1910 South. Beyond that intersection, the street curves slightly to the north and has a viaduct over five sets of railroad tracks owned by the Union Pacific Railroad (UP). East of the viaduct, the street curves to the east-southeast and connects with south end of Colorado Avenue. Continuing south-southeast the street has another viaduct over two more sets of UP tracks before curving to the northeast and reaching its eastern terminus at an intersection  with South State Street (US‑89). The roadway continues (as Slate Canyon Drive) to the northeast before heading northerly to connect with the east end of East 300 South. South State Street heads north-northwest to end at an intersection with East 300 South and the south end of South 700 East. State Street heads southerly to pass through Springville and Mapleton before reaching a junction with U.S. Route 6 at the mouth of Spanish Fork Canyon.

Running along the south side of the parkway, from the Provo Airport to the I‑15 southbound on ramp, is the  Lakeview Parkway Trail. Although the trail is multi-use, it is often referred to as a bikeway.

History
Original construction of parkway only had it running west from the intersection of Mike Jense Parkway and South 3110 West to the I‑15/US‑189 interchange. As construction began, (with groundbreaking on May 8, 2014) only the section of the current parkway north of West Center Street was referred to as Lakeview Parkway. The section south of West Center Street and west of I‑15 was referred to as the West Side Connector. However, by the time the initial section of what had been referred to as the West Side Connector was opened for traffic on October 13, 2016, it was also signed as Lakeview Parkway. (The east end of the current parkway, east of I‑15 [formerly East 1860 South], had been constructed with 4-5 lanes about 20 years prior and was not considered part of the project.) While this initial section was graded for four lanes, only the two eastbound were paved from South 3110 West to just west of the intersection with South 500 West. East of that point, the parkway was a 4-lane divided highway through the I‑15/US‑189 interchange. Several years after initial construction, a traffic signal was installed at the intersection with South 500 West. In preparation for the construction of the new campus of Provo High School the section between West 620 North and West 1280 North was graded and the northbound two lanes were paved.

The year following the opening of the initial section, the $39 million project was named Project of the Year by the Utah Chapter of the American Public Works Association.

By late 2019 the north end of South 3110 (which previously connected with the south end of Lakeshore Drive) was shifted west at a point on West Center Street that is nearly due south of south end of the northern section of Lakeview Parkway (near the high school). The south end of previous northernmost segment of South 3100 West was adjusted to form a T-intersection with Lakeview Parkway and was designated as the southern end of Lakeshore Drive. The remaining section of South 3110 West (south to Mike Jense Parkway) was designated as Lakeview Parkway. About the same time, the length of the road previously signed as East 1860 South (between the I‑15/US‑189 interchange and South State Street [US‑89]) was also designated part of Lakeview Parkway and signage was changed to reflect this change.

Future
The west end of the street will ultimately be extended north to connect with Geneva Road (SR‑114), at about 2000 North on the Provo–Orem line.  The gap between West Center Street North Boat Harbor Drive, which includes a bridge over the Provo River, is under construction. Eventually, as traffic increased along the street the entire length of the parkway will be widened to 4-5 lanes.

Major intersections

See also

Notes

References

External references

Transportation in Utah County, Utah
Streets in Utah